Elachista lurida is a moth of the family Elachistidae that is found in California.

The forewings are broad and whitish, with brownish scales along the veins. The hindwings are light grey and the underside of the wings is grey.

Etymology
The species name is derived from Latin luridus (meaning pale).

References

Moths described in 1997
lurida
Endemic fauna of California
Moths of North America
Fauna without expected TNC conservation status